Irenopsis is a genus of fungi in the family Meliolaceae. The genus was circumscribed by mycologist Frank Lincoln Stevens in 1927.

References

Fungal plant pathogens and diseases
Sordariomycetes genera
Meliolaceae